Benjamin Strettell Clarke   was the third Archdeacon of Liverpool, serving from 1887 until his death  on 18 November 1895.

Jones was educated at Trinity College, Dublin and ordained in 1846. He was appointed the Perpetual curate at Christ Church Southport in 1849. Later he was the incumbent at Eccleston, Cheshire. His sons were also  Anglican priests.

References

Archdeacons of Liverpool
Alumni of Trinity College Dublin
1895 deaths
Year of birth missing